Stephen Karl "Steve" Rerych (born May 14, 1946) is an American retired surgeon and former swimmer, Olympic champion, and former world record-holder.

Swimming career 
At the 1968 Summer Olympics in Mexico City, Rerych won two gold medals.  He swam the second leg for the winning U.S. team in the men's 4×100-meter freestyle relay; with relay teammates Zac Zorn, Mark Spitz and Ken Walsh, he helped set a new world record of 3:31.7 in the event final.  He received another gold medal as a member of the first-place U.S. team in the 4×200-meter freestyle relay, together with teammates John Nelson, Spitz and Don Schollander.  Individually, he also competed in the preliminary heats of the men's 200-meter freestyle, clocking a time of 2:00.6, but did not advance.

Professional career 
He later went on to become a general surgeon.  Rerych received his medical degree from Columbia University College of Physicians and Surgeons in 1974.  In 1975, he completed his internship at Duke University Medical Center in general and thoracic surgery.  In 1986, Rerych was named the Chief Resident in General, Vascular and Thoracic Surgery at Duke University and the Veteran's Medical Center in Asheville, North Carolina.  In 1990 he had his first and only child, Stephanie Rerych.  In 1991, he served as an assistant clinical professor of general, vascular and thoracic surgery at the same institutions.  Prior to moving to West Virginia, he was in private practice as a general, thoracic and plastic surgeon in Asheville, practicing at Memorial Mission Hospital and St. Joseph's Hospital (now combined as The Mission St. Joseph's Health System).

See also

 List of Columbia University alumni
 List of North Carolina State University people
 List of Olympic medalists in swimming (men)
 World record progression 4 × 100 metres freestyle relay

References

 
  NC State's 2014 Hall of Fame Class: Dr. Steve Rerych – 2014 Hall of Fame Class article at Gopack.com

1946 births
Living people
Peekskill Military Academy alumni
American male freestyle swimmers
American plastic surgeons
Columbia University Vagelos College of Physicians and Surgeons alumni
World record setters in swimming
NC State Wolfpack men's swimmers
Olympic gold medalists for the United States in swimming
Swimmers from Philadelphia
Swimmers at the 1968 Summer Olympics
Medalists at the 1968 Summer Olympics